Burton Hill Mustin (February 8, 1884 – January 28, 1977) was an American character actor. Over the course of his career, he appeared in over 150 film and television productions. He also worked in radio and appeared in stage productions.

Mustin began his professional acting career at the age of 67 after director William Wyler cast him in the 1951 film noir Detective Story. Known for his dependability and versatility, Mustin went on to establish a career as a well-known character actor and worked extensively in film and television from the 1950s to the 1970s. His last major role was as Arthur Lanson on the CBS sitcom Phyllis, appearing on the show into 1976, shortly before his death at almost 93 years old.

Early life
Mustin was born in Pittsburgh, to William I. and Sadie (Dorrington) Mustin. His father worked as a stockbroker. Mustin graduated from Pennsylvania Military College (renamed Widener University in 1972) with a degree in civil engineering, in 1903. He was first trombone in the band and also played goaltender for their ice hockey team in 1902. He was the last surviving member of his 1903 class.  He worked as an engineer but later decided to go into sales. In 1916, Mustin began working as an automobile salesman selling Oakland Sensible Sixes. He later began selling the luxury Franklins. After the Franklin company went out of business, he sold Mercurys and Lincolns until civilian car production was halted during World War II. He then worked as a fiscal agent for the Better Business Bureau and the Chamber of Commerce.

Before he began a professional career in show business, Mustin did amateur acting and performing.  In 1921, he became the first announcer for a variety show broadcast on Pittsburgh's then newly established KDKA radio station. He appeared in productions in the Pittsburgh Savoyards (a Gilbert and Sullivan troupe) and the Pittsburgh Opera. He was also a member of the Barbershop Harmony Society, making his first trip to California in 1925 to compete in a quartet competition being held in San Francisco. During this trip the group with their wives made a visit to Hollywood as tourists, but Mustin was not interested in a film career at that point because of his cozy life with his wife in Pittsburgh. They used their Lions Club contacts to secure lodging during the trip.

After retiring, Mustin moved to Tucson, Arizona. Director William Wyler saw him there in a stage production of Detective Story at the Sombrero Playhouse. Wyler told Mustin to look him up if he decided to pursue a screen career. Mustin did contact Wyler, who cast him in the 1951 film version of Detective Story. Mustin's acting career then took off, and he began landing roles in films and television series. He later moved to Los Angeles.

Career

Television

1950s and 1960s
Mustin made his television debut in 1951 with a role in the Western series The Adventures of Kit Carson. In 1953, he played a cotton farmer in A Lion in the Streets starring James Cagney.  Almost from the start to the end of his career, Mustin specialized in playing older men, and with his tall scarecrow frame, bald head and beaked nose, he became one of the most familiar and busiest elderly character actors. Throughout the 1950s, he made guest appearances on Leave It to Beaver, The Abbott and Costello Show, The Loretta Young Show, Cavalcade of America, The Public Defender, Treasury Men in Action, The Lone Ranger, Fireside Theater, Tales of the Texas Rangers, Mackenzie's Raiders, Lux Video Theatre, Studio 57,  Dragnet, Our Miss Brooks, It's a Great Life, The Gale Storm Show, General Electric Theater, Peter Gunn, and The Texan, among many others. Mustin also starred in the TV series pilot episode of The Lone Wolf starring Louis Hayward in 1954.

In 1960, Mustin guest starred on The Twilight Zone in the episode "The Night of the Meek" alongside Art Carney. He also appeared in a second episode of the series Kick the Can in 1962. In 1964, he had an uncredited role in The Outer Limits episode "The Guests".

During the 1960s, Mustin made one or more appearances on Bonanza, Gunsmoke, Ichabod and Me, The Many Loves of Dobie Gillis, Dragnet, The Alfred Hitchcock Hour, Get Smart, The New Phil Silvers Show, The Beverly Hillbillies, Dr. Kildare, The Jack Benny Program, Ben Casey, The Monkees, The Virginian, Cimarron Strip, My Three Sons, Batman (episode 48), and Bewitched. In 1969, he co-starred in the television film The Over-the-Hill Gang. He also appeared in the sequel film The Over-the-Hill Gang Rides Again the following year.

In addition to guest-starring roles, Mustin also had recurring roles on several television shows during the 1950s and 1960s. In 1955, he played the role of "Foley" in The Great Gildersleeve. From 1957 to 1958, he appeared as Mr. Finley on Date with the Angels. In 1957, he made his first appearance as "Gus the Fireman" on Leave It to Beaver. Mustin would continue in the role until 1962, making a total of 15 appearances on the show. In 1960, he made his first guest appearance on The Andy Griffith Show as Judd Fletcher. He appeared in the role until 1966; however in Season 6, Episode 17 (Return of Barney Fife), he is referred to as "ole man Crowley". He also portrayed "Old Uncle Joe" on two episodes of The Lucy Show in 1967. The following year, Mustin guest starred as "Grandpa Jenson" in three episodes of Petticoat Junction.

1970s
During the 1970s, Mustin continued with guest roles on All in the Family , The Brady Bunch, The Mary Tyler Moore Show, Love, American Style, Adam-12, Emergency! and Sanford and Son (episode "Home Sweet Home for the Aged".)

Known for his quick wit and song-and-dance abilities, Mustin was a frequent guest on The Tonight Show Starring Johnny Carson during the 1970s. From 1971 to 1976, he appeared in five episodes of All in the Family (his first appearance as a night watchman, and an additional four appearances in a recurring role as "Justin Quigley").

In 1971, Mustin co-starred in the sketch comedy show The Funny Side. Hosted by Gene Kelly, the series featured an ensemble cast of five married couples that dealt with various issues through comedy sketches and song-and-dance routines. Mustin was cast opposite Queenie Smith as "the elderly couple". The series debuted on NBC in September 1971 and was canceled in January 1972.

Mustin guest starred as Jethroe Collins, a relative of a Jesse James victim, in the "Bobby's Hero" episode of The Brady Bunch during the 1972–73 season.

The next year, Mustin costarred in the television film version of Miracle on 34th Street, starring Sebastian Cabot, and had an uncredited role in the Disney television film Now You See Him, Now You Don't. Mustin's last continuing role was on the television series Phyllis, in which he played the suitor, and later husband, of Sally "Mother" Dexter, a role he played until shortly before his death.

Films
In addition to his extensive work in television, Mustin also appeared in numerous films. He made his film debut at the age of 67 in Detective Story, in 1951. He followed this with roles in Talk About a Stranger (1952), The Sellout (1952), The Silver Whip (1953), Half a Hero (1953), She Couldn't Say No (1954), The Desperate Hours (1955), Man with the Gun (1955), Storm Center (1956), and The Sheepman (1958).

In the 1960s and 1970s, Mustin appeared in The Adventures of Huckleberry Finn (1960), Hemingway's Adventures of a Young Man (1962), Twilight of Honor (1963), What a Way to Go! (1964), The Misadventures of Merlin Jones (1964), Sex and the Single Girl (1964), The Cincinnati Kid (1965), Cat Ballou (1965) (uncredited as a former gunfighter "Old ... Old ... ?" ), The Ghost and Mr. Chicken (1965), The Adventures of Bullwhip Griffin (1967), Speedway (uncredited) (1968), The Shakiest Gun in the West (1968), The Great Bank Robbery (1969), Hail, Hero! (1969), and Skin Game (1971). In 1974, Mustin portrayed "Uncle Jeff" in the musical film Mame, starring Lucille Ball and Bea Arthur. He also had a small role in Herbie Rides Again, also released in 1974. The next year, he appeared as "Regent Appleby" in The Strongest Man in the World. His final film role came in 1976 in the Western film Baker's Hawk, starring Clint Walker and Burl Ives.

Tribute
In 2000 TVLand created a series of commercials celebrating the often-seen but little-known-by-name character actors who regularly appeared in their shows, with Mustin being featured in one.

Personal life
Mustin was one of the 110 original founders of the Pittsburgh chapter of the Lions Club which was established in 1921. He served as one of the presidents and remained active in the club for the remainder of his life.

Mustin married Frances Robina Woods in 1915. The couple remained together for 54 years, until her death in 1969. They had no children.

Death
On January 28, 1977, Mustin died at Glendale Memorial Hospital in Glendale, California, at the age of 92. Funeral services were held at Forest Lawn Memorial Park in Hollywood Hills, California.

Filmography

References

Further reading

External links

 
 
 
  as Burt Mustin Theater, Widener College, Chester, Pa.

1884 births
1977 deaths
20th-century American male actors
Barbershop Harmony Society
Male actors from Pittsburgh
American male film actors
American male radio actors
American male stage actors
American male television actors
Burials at Forest Lawn Memorial Park (Hollywood Hills)
Male Western (genre) film actors
Widener University alumni